The Çamlık Railway Museum, a.k.a. Çamlık Steam Locomotive Museum, ( or Çamlık Buharlı Lokomotif Müzesi) is an outdoor railway museum at Çamlık village of Selçuk district in Izmir Province, Turkey. It is the largest railway museum in Turkey and contains one of the largest steam locomotive collections in Europe.

History
The museum is located on a former part of the ORC mainline, the oldest line in Turkey, near the village Çamlık, very close to the historical site at Ephesus. When the tracks on the Izmir-to-Aydın main line were realigned, a small portion of the line, as well as the original Çamlık railway station, were abandoned. The museum was started in 1991, and completed in 1997. It uses the original tracks built in 1866.

While the land, the buildings and the collection are all the property of the Turkish State Railways (TCDD), the museum is run by Atilla Mısırlıoğlu on a 99-year lease. He is the son of the first signalman serving at the Çamlık railway station.

Museum
In the museum, there are 33 steam locomotives displayed outside, half of them arrayed around an 18-road turntable. The manufacturing years of the locomotives range from 1891 to 1951. The oldest one is built by Robert Stephenson & Company, England. The steam engines on display were made by: Henschel (8), Maffei (2), Borsig (1), BMAG (2), MBA (1), Krupp (3), Humboldt (1) from Germany; NOHAB (2) from Sweden; ČKD (1) from Czechoslovakia; Robert Stephenson & Company (2), North British Locomotive Company (1), Beyer, Peacock & Company (1) from the UK; Lima Locomotive Works (1), ALCO (1), Vulcan Iron Works (1) from the USA; and Creusot (1), Batignolles (1), Corpet-Louvet (2) from France. Visitors may climb up into the engines. The locomotives are provided with plaques giving information about technical details.

The steam locomotive number 45501, which was involved in the Yarımburgaz train disaster as part of the Orient Express, is exhibited in the museum. The head-on collision in 1957, with its death toll of 95, is the deadliest train accident in Turkey as of 2010.

The museum has nine passenger cars including two wooden cars. The salon car used by Mustafa Kemal Atatürk (1881-1938) can be visited inside. There are also seven freight cars on display. In addition to various rolling stock, there are many railway and rail station utilities at the facility such as a water tower, road turntable, hand lorry and crane.

See also
 History of rail transport in Turkey
 TCDD Open Air Steam Locomotive Museum in Ankara
 Istanbul Railway Museum
Atatürk's Residence and Railway Museum in Ankara

References

External links
 Image gallery of the museum items at Trains of Turkey website
 Image gallery of the museum items at International Steam website

Railway museums in Turkey
Museums in İzmir Province
Museums established in 1997
1997 establishments in Turkey
Selçuk District
Open-air museums in Turkey